Dudley John Beger (1929-1994) was an Australian rugby league footballer who played in the 1950s, and coached in the 1960s.

Playing and coaching career
Beger played his grade career at Western Suburbs for four years between 1950 and 1953. After retiring as a player, he went into coaching the lower grades at Wests before ultimately taking over the first grade team for one season in 1960.

Later life
Beger went on to an administrative career at Western Suburbs, becoming club secretary in the 1970s.

Beger died on 18 May 1994, aged 65.

References

1929 births
1994 deaths
Australian rugby league administrators
Australian rugby league coaches
Australian rugby league players
Place of birth missing
Western Suburbs Magpies coaches
Western Suburbs Magpies players